David Baldwin is an English football executive who served as CEO of the English Football League between June and December 2020. In October 2022 he became Managing Director of Huddersfield Town.

Career
Baldwin played football for the youth team of Bradford City.

He was appointed to the role of CEO of the English Football League in December 2019, replacing Shaun Harvey, and officially began on 17 June 2020. He previously held executive roles at Bradford City and Burnley. Whilst at Burnley, in December 2018 he was nominated for the Premier League CEO of the Year at the Football Business awards.

On 12 October 2020 it was announced that Baldwin would step down from his role with the EFL in six months time. He was replaced by Trevor Birch, who began his job on 1 January 2021.

Baldwin is also part owner of the RIASA football academy in Leeds, alongside founder Mark Ellis.

In October 2022 he became Managing Director of Huddersfield Town, having worked for the club as a Strategic Advisor since May 2022.

References

Date of birth missing (living people)
Living people
English sports businesspeople
Bradford City A.F.C. non-playing staff
Burnley F.C. non-playing staff
English Football League
RIASA
Year of birth missing (living people)
English footballers
Bradford City A.F.C. players
Huddersfield Town A.F.C. non-playing staff